A list of films produced in France in 1950.

See also
1950 in France

References

External links
French films of 1950 at the Internet Movie Database
French films of 1950 at Cinema-francais.fr

1950
Films
French